This is a partial chronological list of cases decided by the United States Supreme Court during the Marshall Court, the tenure of Chief Justice John Marshall from February 4, 1801 through July 6, 1835.

See also
 List of criminal cases in the Marshall Court

References

External links
 The Marshall Court, 1801-1835, Supreme Court Historical Society
 US Supreme Court Opinions by Chief Justice and Year, Justia

Marshall